The Philippines sawtail catshark (Galeus friedrichi) is a rare species of sawtail catshark native to the Philippines. Only three specimens have been caught and is not known to attack humans.

Distribution and habitat 
This shark is endemic to marine waters off Dapitan, Philippines.

Anatomy and appearance 
It has enlarged denticles on the caudal fin, giving it a ''sawtail'' appearance like all other sawtail catsharks. The shark's body and caudal fin are not blotched. It also grows to  TL and has more vertebrae, distinguishing it from all other catsharks.

References 

Fish described in 2022
Fish of the Philippines
Galeus